Priest Hutton is a civil parish in Lancaster, Lancashire, England. It contains twelve listed buildings that are recorded in the National Heritage List for England.  All of the listed buildings are designated at Grade II, the lowest of the three grades, which is applied to "buildings of national importance and special interest".  The parish contains the village of Priest Hutton, and is otherwise rural.  Most of the listed buildings are houses, farmhouse and farm buildings.  The Lancaster Canal passes through the parish, and a bridge crossing it is listed.  Also listed is the telephone kiosk in the centre of the village.

Buildings

References

Citations

Sources

Lists of listed buildings in Lancashire
Buildings and structures in the City of Lancaster